El Seibo, alternatively spelt El Seybo, is a province of the Dominican Republic. Before 1992 it included what is now Hato Mayor province.

Municipalities and municipal districts
The province as of June 20, 2006 is divided into the following municipalities (municipios) and municipal districts (distrito municipal - M.D.) within them:

Santa Cruz de El Seibo, head municipality of the province
Pedro Sánchez (M.D.)
San Francisco-Vicentillo (M.D.)
Santa Lucía (M.D.)
Miches
El Cedro (M.D.)
La Gina (M.D.)

The following is a sortable table of the municipalities and municipal districts with population figures as of the 2014 estimate. Urban population are those living in the seats (cabeceras, literally heads) of municipalities or of municipal districts. Rural population are those living in the districts (secciones, literally sections) and neighborhoods (Pparajes, literally places) outside them. The population figures are from the 2014 population estimate.
For comparison with the municipalities and municipal districts of other provinces see the list of municipalities and municipal districts of the Dominican Republic.

For comparison with the municipalities and municipal districts of other provinces see the list of municipalities and municipal districts of the Dominican Republic.

Politics
In the 2006 elections, one senator and three deputies were elected for the province. The senator is Juan Roberto Rodríguez Hernández from the Dominican Revolutionary Party (PRD). The deputies are Kenia Milagros Mejía Mercedes of the Dominican Liberation Party (PLD), Juan Maldonado Castro (PRD), and Juan Roberto Rodríguez Hernández (PRD).

Notable people
 Charytin  singer and actress, born in the town of Santa Lucia.
 Carlos Febles - baseball player and coach

References

External links

  Oficina Nacional de Estadística, Statistics Portal of the Dominican Republic
  Oficina Nacional de Estadística, Maps with administrative division of the provinces of the Dominican Republic, downloadable in PDF format

 
Provinces of the Dominican Republic
States and territories established in 1844